Paul Carroll Skiba (born February 23, 1960), his daughter Sarah Arielle Skiba (born July 27, 1989), and Lorenzo DeShawn Chivers (born November 5, 1962), an employee of Skiba's moving business, disappeared under mysterious circumstances in Westminster, Colorado, United States, on February 7, 1999.

On the day they went missing, Sarah accompanied her father Paul, who owned the Tuff Movers company in Westminster, on a job along with his employee Chivers. The three were last seen in Morrison that evening. Sarah was reported missing by her mother after Paul failed to return her home from her weekend visitation; at this time, it was discovered that Paul and Chivers were also missing. A moving truck located at the Tuff Movers lot was subsequently discovered with bullet holes in its side, blood evidence, as well as a portion of human scalp near its windshield; a metal extension ramp for the truck was also missing from the lot.

The disappearances of the Skibas and Chivers received national attention, and were profiled on The Montel Williams Show, America's Most Wanted, and by journalist Nancy Grace. In 2016, their names were included on a list of missing persons as part of a Colorado Senate bill petitioning for a statewide Missing Persons Day, which was signed into law on February 5 of that year. As of 2022, the whereabouts of the Skibas and Chivers are still unknown, though law enforcement suspects foul play in their disappearances, and they are each presumed victims of homicide.

Timeline

Background
Nine-year-old Sarah Arielle Skiba spent the weekend of February 5, 1999, with her father, Paul Carroll Skiba, at his home in Thornton, Colorado. Paul and Sarah's mother, Michelle Russell, were divorced. Paul was the owner of Tuff Movers, a local moving company in the Westminster area, and shared custody of Sarah. Sarah spent every other weekend with her father.

Paul's on-and-off girlfriend, Teresa Donovan, lived with him on his property and had recently given birth to a baby boy. Paul had told friends the week before that he questioned whether or not he had fathered the child, and would often "come home from work to find [Donovan] still in bed or partying next door with a neighbor, leaving Sarah to take care of the baby." He also mentioned his plans to kick Donovan out of his home and sue for full custody should a paternity test prove the child was his.

Disappearance
On Sunday, February 7, 1999, Paul's mother Sharon received a phone call from Donovan claiming that Paul had not arrived home that day from a job he had scheduled with his employee and co-worker, Lorenzo DeShawn Chivers. Sarah had accompanied both on a job in Westminster that evening, departing for the Tuff Movers store, located at 72nd Avenue and Raleigh Street, around 5:30 p.m. The three were last seen at approximately 6:00 p.m. in Morrison. When Paul failed to return home, Teresa phoned the police department, but stated they "did not take her seriously," after which Sharon placed a call regarding Paul's absence. Some time later, Michelle phoned police again, notifying them that Sarah had not been returned from her weekend stay with Paul.

Subsequent events
On Monday, February 8, Jerry Bybee, another of Paul's employees, arrived at the Tuff Movers store and noticed that the company's large moving truck had been unusually parked front-first and crooked. Bybee recalled: "Paul was a neat freak, anal about everything, so I'm thinking, 'Oh, I can't wait to hear why the truck's parked like that' — because Paul would have a story." Bybee also noted that the lock on the front gate had been changed, leaving him unable to enter the parking lot. After Paul and Chivers failed to arrive at the Tuff store, Bybee subsequently phoned police.

Three days later, on February 11, law enforcement entered the Tuff Movers lot with Bybee assisting them; there, Bybee noticed a puddle of motor oil partly covered with a piece of plywood in the van lot. He would later state that he felt the investigating officer "destroyed more evidence than he was willing to look at." On February 13, a friend of Paul's, Rich Lesmeister, received a phone call from Donovan notifying him that Paul, Sarah, and Lorenzo were missing; he stated this was the first he had been made aware of their disappearances. 

That afternoon, Lesmeister and his wife, Carol, met with Sharon at the Tuff Movers lot to further investigate the premises themselves; Lesmeister, an auto mechanic, had recently worked on a 1978 Chevrolet moving truck at the lot. He and Carol climbed over the fence, and upon investigating found multiple bullet holes in the side of the truck he had previously been working on. The exterior of the truck also had a bloodstain smeared across it, and a chunk of what appeared to be a human scalp was lying near the windshield.

Investigation
Law enforcement initially treated the case as a kidnapping, assuming that Paul had taken Sarah and run away with her. Upon further investigation, the Colorado Bureau of Investigation (CBI) found evidence of blood covering the back of the truck and cab via luminol. DNA analysis proved the blood to be a mixture of Sarah's and Paul's. The large amount of blood led authorities to believe that both were dead. On February 17, 1999, a vehicle belonging to Chivers was discovered parked at an apartment complex at 3809 68th Avenue in Westminster, several blocks from the Tuff Movers lot. Ten days later, on February 27, a vehicle belonging to Paul was discovered in an apartment complex parking lot at 3129 Arkansas Avenue in Denver. In March 1999, five weeks after the three disappearances, Thornton police and the CBI formally stated they had evidence suggesting foul play.

A witness claimed to have heard a woman screaming at the Tuff Movers lot the night of the disappearances, February 7. Other witnesses later told police that the truck in question had been seen leaving the lot between seven and eight times that night before returning around approximately midnight. This led police to determine that the bodies of Chivers, Paul, and Sarah could "not be more than a couple of hours away." An extension ramp was missing from one of the trucks, leading authorities to suspect the killer(s) may have used it to sink the three's remains in a lake, as vegetation discovered in the truck radiator indicated it had been driven near a body of water. Search canines were used in an attempt to trace the bodies, and NecroSearch, a company specializing in recovery of human remains, assisted in searches of lakes in the region.

Publicity
Donovan appeared on The Montel Williams Show to speak regarding the disappearances. She also appeared on a subsequent MSNBC special, during which she disclosed that law enforcement had told her she failed a polygraph examination. "I'd never hurt them," she told the MSNBC interviewer. "I'd never hurt them. The police have tried to say that I killed them or I had them killed." Donovan claimed in this special that Paul was killed by drug dealers who rented parking spaces from the Tuff Movers lot, and whose vehicles he had recently towed. The case has received coverage from Fox's America's Most Wanted and journalist Nancy Grace.

See also
List of people who disappeared

Notes

References

External links
Lorenzo Chivers at The Doe Network
Paul Skiba at The Doe Network
Sarah Skiba at The Doe Network

1990s missing person cases
1999 in Colorado
1999 murders in the United States
February 1999 events in the United States
Mass disappearances
Missing American children
Missing person cases in Colorado
Murdered African-American people
Murdered American children
People murdered in Colorado
Westminster, Colorado